The Declaration of Independence  is the statement adopted by the 33 Korean representatives meeting at Taehwagwan, the restaurant located in Insa-dong, Jongno District, Seoul on March 1, 1919, four months after the end of World War I, which announced that Korea would no longer tolerate Japanese rule.

This was the beginning of the March 1st Movement, which was violently suppressed by Japanese authorities, as well as the cornerstone of the establishment of the Korean Provisional Government one month later. Nearly thirty years later, Korea's true independence came after the surrender of the Empire of Japan at the end of World War II.

The following is the English translation of the original Korean version:
Declaration of Independence

We hereby declare that Korea is an independent state and that Koreans are a selfgoverning people. We proclaim it to the nations of the world in affirmation of the principle of the equality of all nations, and we proclaim it to our posterity, preserving in perpetuity the right of national survival. We make this declaration on the strength of five thousand years of history as an expression of the devotion and loyalty of twenty million people. We claim independence in the interest of the eternal and free development of our people and in accordance with the great movement for world reform based upon the awakening conscience of mankind. This is the clear command of heaven, the course of our times, and a legitimate manifestation of the right of all nations to coexist and live in harmony. Nothing in the world can suppress or block it.
 
For the first time in several thousand years, we have suffered the agony of alien suppression for a decade, becoming a victim of the policies of aggression and coercion, which are relics from a bygone era. How long have we been deprived of our right to exist? How long has our spiritual development been hampered? How long have the opportunities to contribute our creative vitality to the development of world culture been denied us?
 
Alas! In order to rectify past grievances, free ourselves from present hardships, eliminate future threats, stimulate and enhance the weakened conscience of our people, eradicate the shame that befell our nation, ensure proper development of human dignity, avoid leaving humiliating legacies to our children, and usher in lasting and complete happiness for our posterity, the most urgent task is to firmly establish national independence. Today when human nature and conscience are placing the forces of justice and humanity on our side, if every one of our twenty million people arms himself for battle, whom could we not defeat and what could we not accomplish?
 
We do not intend to accuse Japan of infidelity for its violation of various solemn treaty obligations since the Treaty of Amity of 1876. Japan’s scholars and officials, indulging in a conqueror’s exuberance, have denigrated the accomplishments of our ancestors and treated our civilized people like barbarians. Despite their disregard for the ancient origins of our society and the brilliant spirit of our people, we shall not blame Japan; we must first blame ourselves before finding fault with others. Because of the urgent need for remedies for the problems of today, we cannot afford the time for recriminations over past wrongs.
 
Our task today is to build up our own strength, not to destroy others. We must chart a new course for ourselves in accord with the solemn dictates of conscience, not malign and reject others for reasons of past enmity or momentary passions. In order to restore natural and just conditions, we must remedy the unnatural and unjust conditions brought about by the leaders of Japan, who are chained to old ideas and old forces and victimized by their obsession with glory.
  
From the outset the union of the two countries did not emanate from the wishes of the people, and its outcome has been oppressive coercion, discriminatory injustice, and fabrication of statistical data, thereby deepening the eternally irreconcilable chasm of ill will between the two nations. To correct past mistakes and open a new phase of friendship based upon genuine understanding and sympathy — is this not the easiest way to avoid disaster and invite blessing? The enslavement of twenty million resentful people by force does not contribute to lasting peace in the East. It deepens the fear and suspicion of Japan by the four hundred million Chinese who constitute the main axis for stability in the East, and it will lead to the tragic downfall of all nations in our region. Independence for Korea today shall not only enable Koreans to lead a normal, prosperous life, as is their due; it will also guide Japan to leave its evil path and perform its great task of supporting the cause of the East, liberating China from a gnawing uneasiness and fear and helping the cause of world peace and happiness for mankind, which depends greatly on peace in the East. How can this be considered a trivial issue of mere sentiment?
 
Behold! A new world is before our eyes. The days of force are gone, and the days of morality are here. The spirit of humanity, nurtured throughout the past century, has begun casting its rays of new civilization upon human history. A new spring has arrived prompting
the myriad forms of life to come to life again. The past was a time of freezing ice and snow, stifling the breath of life; the present is a time of mild breezes and warm sunshine, reinvigorating the spirit. Facing the return of the universal cycle, we set forth on the changing tide of the world. Nothing can make us hesitate or fear.
 
We shall safeguard our inherent right to freedom and enjoy a life of prosperity; we shall also make use of our creativity, enabling our national essence to blossom in the vernal warmth. We have arisen now. Conscience is on our side, and truth guides our way. All of us, men and women, young and old, have firmly left behind the old nest of darkness and gloom and head for joyful resurrection together with the myriad living things. The spirits of thousands of generations of our ancestors protect us; the rising tide of world consciousness shall assist us. Once started, we shall surely succeed. With this hope we march forward.
 

Three Open Pledges

1. Our action today represents the demand of our people for justice, humanity, survival, and dignity. It manifests our spirit of freedom and should not engender antiforeign feelings.

2. To the last one of us and to the last moment possible, we shall unhesitatingly publicize the views of our people, as is our right.
 
3. All our actions should scrupulously uphold public order, and our demands and our attitudes must be honorable and upright.
  

The First Day of March of the 4252nd Year (1919) of the Kingdom of Korea

Son Pyong-hui, Kil Son-ju, Yi Pil-chu, Paek Yong-song, Kim Wan-gyu, Kim Pyong-jo, Kim Chang-jun, Kwon Tong-jin, Kwon Pyong-dok, Na Yong-hwan, Na In-hyop, Yang Chon-baek, Yang Han-muk, Yu Yo-dae, Yi Kap-song, Yi Myong-yong, Yi Sung-hun, Yi Chong-hun, Yi Chong-il, Lim Ye-hwan, Pak Chun-sung, Pak Hui-do, Pak Tong-wan, Shin Hong-shik, Shin Sok-ku, O Se-chang, O Hwa-yong, Chong Ch’un-su, Choe Song-mo, Choe Rin, Han Yong-un, Hong Pyong-gi, and Hong Ki-jo

References

Declarations of independence
March 1919 events
1919 in Korea
1919 documents
South Korean documents